Commodity Exchange Act (ch. 545, enacted June 15, 1936) is a federal act enacted in 1936 by the U.S. Government, with some of its provisions amending the Grain Futures Act of 1922.

The Act provides federal regulation of all commodities and futures trading activities and requires all futures and commodity options to be traded on organized exchanges. In 1974, the Commodity Futures Trading Commission (CFTC) was created as a result of the Commodity Exchange Act, and in 1982 the National Futures Association (NFA) was created by CFTC.

See also
Grain Futures Act
National Futures Association
Commodity Futures Trading Commission
Futures exchange
Futures contract
Commodity Futures Modernization Act of 2000

External links
 7 U.S. Code Chapter 1—Commodity Exchanges
 
 Public Law 74-675, 74th Congress, H. R. 6772: Commodity Exchange Act

Commodity markets in the United States
United States federal commodity and futures legislation
1936 in American law